State Highway 96 (abbreviated SH-96) is a short,  highway in Love Co., Oklahoma. It runs south from State Highway 32 to Burneyville, curves west and turns into Burneyville Road. It has no lettered spur routes.

SH-96 was created in the mid-1950s. Initially, the highway had a gravel surface.

Route description
The road then turns north, crossing over Simon Creek, before coming to an end at SH-32 at Dunbar, an unincorporated place. The roadbed continues north as Eastman Road.

SH-96 serves the Burneyville area, which includes the Falconhead Resort & Country Club, a former PGA Tour golf course, and the Red River Research and Demonstration Farm, an agricultural research operation run by the Samuel Roberts Noble Foundation.

History
State Highway 96 was first shown on the 1958 state highway map (implying its creation in 1957) as a gravel highway. The route was otherwise identical to that of the present day. The route was paved over the following year.

Junction list

References

External links

SH-96 at OKHighways

Transportation in Love County, Oklahoma
096